The Little River, a perennial river that is part of the Hawkesbury-Nepean catchment, is located in the Central Tablelands region of New South Wales, Australia.

Course and features
The Little River rises between the Mini Mini Range and Black Range within the Great Dividing Range, and flows generally east southeast, before reaching its confluence with the Coxs River on the south-western boundary of the Blue Mountains National Park, near Ironpot Mountain, within the Kanangra-Boyd National Park. The river descends  over its  course as it flows through the Jenolan State Forest.

See also 

 List of rivers of New South Wales (L–Z)
 List of rivers of Australia
 Rivers of New South Wales

References

External links
 

Rivers of New South Wales
Central Tablelands
Oberon Council